Nicolas Hoffmann (19 August 1940 – 9 January 2018) was a Luxembourgian footballer. He played in 50 matches for the Luxembourg national football team from 1960 to 1972.

References

External links
 

1940 births
2018 deaths
Luxembourgian footballers
Luxembourg international footballers
Place of birth missing
Association footballers not categorized by position